Ronald Fuentes (born March 1, 2002) is an American soccer player who currently plays as a midfielder for Loudoun United in the USL Championship via the D.C. United academy.

Career statistics

Club

Notes

References

2002 births
Living people
American soccer players
Association football midfielders
Loudoun United FC players
Soccer players from Maryland
USL Championship players
People from Fort Washington, Maryland